This article lists diplomatic missions resident in the Czech Republic. At present, the capital city of Prague hosts 87 embassies. Several other countries have missions accredited from other capitals, mostly in Vienna, Berlin and Moscow. Embassies in Prague are mostly located in historical palaces of Malá Strana - one of Prague's historical and oldest boroughs, or in residential areas of Bubeneč or Střešovice northwest from the historical centre of Prague.

Diplomatic missions in Prague

Other posts 
 (Delegation)

Consulates in the Czech Republic

Non-resident embassies 
Berlin:

Vienna:

 

Moscow:

Brussels:

 

Other cities:

 (Warsaw)
 (London)
 (Moroni)
 (Libreville)
 (Reykjavik)
 (The Hague)
 (Rome)
 (Valletta)
 (Singapore)
 (Geneva)

Former embassies 

 (Closed in 2011)

See also 
 Foreign relations of the Czech Republic
 Visa requirements for Czech citizens

Notes

References

External links 
 Foreign missions to the Czech Republic

List
Czech
Diplomatic missions